Nycteribia kolenatii  is a species of fly in the family Nycteribiidae. It is found in the  Palearctic .

References

External links
Images representing Nycteribia kolenatii  at BOLD

Nycteribiidae
Insects described in 1954
Muscomorph flies of Europe
Wingless Diptera